

Men's singles
Men's singles in "real" tennis is the first world championship in any sport. It predates the use of the term "real tennis," as the sport was called just "tennis" until lawn tennis gained popularity.

Except in cases where the champion has retired, the championship has always been on a challenge basis — the champion retains the title until losing an official challenge or retiring.  Originally, the champion had the right to accept or reject a challenge, usually depending upon the prize money put up by the challenger's sponsor. Several years could thus go by between challenge matches. The top four ranked players in the world (excluding the champion himself) playoff for the right to challenge.  The champion and challenger then play a match of up to 13 sets over three days (4 sets, 4 sets and up to 5 sets on the final day).  In theory, this is the only match the champion has to play in the two years since winning the last one.

The most recent men's world championship match concluded on 15 September 2022. (Due to the pandemic, the 2020 challenge was postponed until 2022).

World Singles Champions

Men's doubles
The men's doubles title is earned in a tournament, played off among the sport's eight top-ranked pairings.  Competed every odd-numbered year, it is hosted in rotation among the countries with active courts in the following order: the United Kingdom, Australia, France, and the United States.  The championship match uses a best of 9 sets format. After the first championship was won by Tim Chisholm and Julian Snow, the title was won and then defended five times by singles world champion Rob Fahey and Steve Virgona. They lost their title in the final set of the final match in 2015, in a championship held at Prested Hall (UK). The title now belongs to Camden Riviere and Tim Chisholm, who defended it successfully in the latest World Championship that took place in January 2019 in Hobart (Australia).

Women's singles
Unlike the men's singles title, the women's title is earned in a tournament.  The title holder must win her way through the draw for the right to defend the championship.  The championship tournament is held every odd-numbered year.  Since 2011 the title has been held by Claire Fahey (née Vigrass).

Women's doubles
The women's doubles world championship is held at the same time and venue as the women's singles championship.  It is also a tournament format, rather than a challenge.

See also

 Grand Slam (real tennis)

Mixed doubles
A mixed doubles world championship has not been organized for real tennis.

References

 Real Tennis World Championship 2004 Program, p. 5, National Tennis Club, Newport, Rhode Island.

External links
 Sports123.com: Real Tennis champions
 Real Tennis & Rackets World Champion Howard Angus 

Tennis, Real

Tennis, Real
World championships in real tennis